Youngmi Mayer is a Korean American stand-up comedian, activist, podcast host, and social media influencer. She is the co-host and host of Feeling Asian and Hairy Butthole, podcasts that highlight the Asian American experience.

Career 

Mayer explores her experience as a queer, divorced, Korean American single mom in her work. She is known for her funny anecdotes and memes on Instagram and Twitter. Additionally, Mayer writes about racism and dating, understanding Asian trauma in white-dominated spaces, dealing with generational trauma, and Asian-centered stereotypes and translation inconsistencies within popular media.

Feeling Asian
The podcast Feeling Asian was created in September 2019 by Youngmi Mayer and Brian Park to speak freely about their personal experience as Asian Americans. Mayer and Park interview notable Asian American figures in pop culture including Michelle Zauner, Janet Yang, Lisa Ling, Bowen Yang, and Yaeji. Feeling Asian's episode on "Feeling Asian" was listed number three on CNN's top ten "podcasts that answered our biggest questions in 2021." The podcast was rewarded for its discussion of anti-Asian hate during the COVID-19 pandemic.

References

Further reading
 Telling Jokes (And Emotional Healing) with Youngmi Mayer 
 Youngmi Mayer's Day Off in NYC's Chinatown Feels Like Home 
 The Power Parents Behind Mission Chinese

Living people
American stand-up comedians
American women podcasters
American podcasters
American people of Korean descent
Year of birth missing (living people)
American women comedians
21st-century American women
American LGBT people of Asian descent
21st-century LGBT people
21st-century American comedians
American comedians of Asian descent